Keys is an English surname. Notable people with the surname include:

Alicia Keys (born 1981), American musician
Ancel Keys (1904–2004), American nutritionist
Bobby Keys (1943–2014), American saxophonist
Carleth Keys, Venezuelan journalist
Clement Keys (1864–1937), English football manager
Clement Melville Keys (1876–1952), American financier
Constance Keys (1886–1964), Australian nurse
David Keys (musician), stage name of David Nicholas Robert Johnson
David Keys, British archaeological journalist
Derek Keys (1931–2018), South African politician 
Jack Keys (1865–1890), English footballer
John Keys (born 1956), British organist
Howard Keys (1935–1971), American football player
Madison Keys (born 1995), American tennis player
Richard Keys (born 1957), English sports presenter
Ronald Keys (born 1945), U.S. Air Force general
Samuel Keys (1771–1850), English china painter
William Keys (disambiguation)

See also
 Key (surname)
 Keyes (disambiguation)

English-language surnames